The Futa Pass or La Futa Pass is a pass in the Tuscan-Emilian Apennines, at an elevation of . It is located in the comune of Firenzuola, in the Metropolitan City of Florence. It separated the valleys of Mugello and of the Santerno River.

It is crossed by the Regional Road 65 (strada della Futa) which connects Florence to Bologna.
During World War II it was part of the Gothic Line. A German military cemetery was created nearby in the 1950s.

Notes

External links

Mountain passes of Tuscany
Mountain passes of the Apennines
Transport in Tuscany
Metropolitan City of Florence